This is a list of rural localities in Tomsk Oblast. Tomsk Oblast (Tomskaya oblast) is a federal subject of Russia (an oblast). It lies in the southeastern West Siberian Plain, in the southwest of the Siberian Federal District. Its administrative center is the city of Tomsk. According to the 2010 Russian Census, the population is 1,047,394.

Locations 
 5 kilometr
 86th Kvartal
 Alexandrovskoye
 Bakchar
 Belostok
 Kargasok
 Komsomolsk
 Kozhevnikovo
 Krivosheino
 Melnikovo
 Molchanovo
 Narym
 Novy Tevriz
 Novy Vasyugan
 Parabel
 Pervomayskoye
 Podgornoye
 Samus
 Sredny Vasyugan
 Teguldet
 Ust-Chizhapka
 Zyryanskoye

See also 
 
 Lists of rural localities in Russia

References 

Tomsk Oblast